Serer, often broken into differing regional dialects such as Serer-Sine and Serer saloum, is a language of the kingdoms of Sine and Saloum branch of Niger–Congo spoken by 1.2 million people in Senegal and 30,000 in the Gambia as of 2009. It is the principal language of the Serer people.

Classification
Serer is one of the Senegambian languages, which are characterized by consonant mutation. The traditional classification of Atlantic languages is that of Sapir (1971), which found that Serer was closest to Fulani. However, a widely cited misreading of the data by Wilson (1989) inadvertently exchanged Serer for Wolof.
Dialects of Serer are Serer Sine (the prestige dialect), Segum, Fadyut-Palmerin, Dyegueme (Gyegem), and Niominka. They are mutually intelligible except for the Sereer spoken in some of the areas surrounding the city of Thiès.

Not all Serer people speak Serer. About 200,000 speak Cangin languages. Because the speakers are ethnically Serer, they are commonly thought to be Serer dialects. However, they are not closely related, and Serer is significantly closer to Fulani (also called Pulbe, Pulaar, or Fulbe) than it is to Cangin.

Phonology

Consonants
The voiceless implosives are highly unusual sounds.

Vowels

Writing system

Greetings

The following greetings and responses are spoken in most regions of Senegal that have Serer speakers.

 Nam fi'o? ('how are you doing?')
 Mexe meen ('I am here')
 Ta mbind na? ('how is the family' or more literally 'how is the house?')
 Awa maa ('they are good' or more literally 'they are there')

Spatial awareness is very important in Sereer. For example, this exchange is only for when the household in question is not nearby.  Certain grammatical changes would occur if the greetings were exchanged in a home that the greeter has just entered:

Ta mbind ne? ('how is the family/house [which is here]?')
Awa meen ('they are good' or more literally 'they are here')

In Senegalese Sereer culture like many cultures in that region, greetings are very important. Sometimes, people will spend several minutes greeting each other.

See also 
 Cangin languages

Notes

Bibliography

External links 

 Sereer Grammar - Sereer wiki
 Decree No. 2005-990 of 21 October 2005 relating to the spelling and the separation of words in Serer via the website of the Journal officiel 

 
Languages of Senegal
Languages of the Gambia
Languages of Mauritania